The Roman Catholic Diocese of Rrëshen  is a diocese located in the city of Rrëshen in the Ecclesiastical province of Tiranë–Durrës in Albania.

History
 December 25, 1888: Established as Territorial Abbacy of Shën Llezhri i Oroshit (St. Alexander Orosci)
 December 7, 1996: Promoted as Diocese of Rrëshen

Ordinaries
 Territorial Abbots of Shën Llezhri i Oroshit
 Abbot Primo Dochi (1888.12.29 – 1919)
 Bishop Joseph Gionali (1921.08.28 – 1928.06.13)
 Bishop Francesco Gjini (1930.06.29 – 1946.01.04)

 Bishops of Rrëshen
 Bishop Angelo Massafra, O.F.M. (1996.12.07 – 1998.03.28, became Metropolitan Archbishop of Shkodre-Pult)
 Bishop Cristoforo Palmieri, C.M. (2005.11.23 – 2017.06.15, Retired)
 Bishop Gjergj Meta (2017.06.15- Present)

See also
 Roman Catholicism in Albania

References

Sources and External Links 
 GCatholic.org
 Catholic Hierarchy

Roman Catholic dioceses in Albania
Religious organizations established in 1888
Roman Catholic dioceses and prelatures established in the 19th century
Rreshen, Roman Catholic Diocese of
Rrëshen